Jayanta Bhattacharya is an Indian Politician belonging to the Indian National Congress. He was elected to the Lok Sabha, lower house of the Parliament of India from Tamluk in West Bengal in 1996. He was elected to the Rajya Sabha as an independent candidate backed by the Trinamool Congress but he rejoined the Congress in 2002.

References

External links 
Official biographical sketch in Parliament of India website 

1947 births
Indian National Congress politicians
People from West Bengal
India MPs 1996–1997
Lok Sabha members from West Bengal
Living people
Rajya Sabha members from West Bengal
People from Purba Medinipur district
Trinamool Congress politicians from West Bengal